The 2014 CS Volvo Open Cup was a senior international figure skating competition held in November 2014 at the Volvo Ice Rink in Riga, Latvia. It was part of the 2014–15 ISU Challenger Series. Medals were awarded in the disciplines of men's singles, ladies' singles, pair skating, and ice dancing.

Results

Medal summary

Men

Ladies

Pairs

Ice dancing

References

External links
 2014 CS Volvo Open Cup at the International Skating Union

Volvo Open Cup
CS Volvo Open Cup, 2014
Volvo Open Cup